Abellanosa is a surname. Notable people with the surname include:

Onofre Abellanosa (1913–1974), Filipino writer
Ramón D. Abellanosa (1907–1983), Filipino journalist and writer
Rodrigo Abellanosa (born 1961), Filipino politician
Victorina A. Abellanosa (1903–1968), Filipino writer